Corboz is a surname. Notable people with the surname include:

Bernard Corboz (1948–2013), Swiss judge
Daphne Corboz (born 1993), French-American soccer player
Mael Corboz (born 1994), American soccer player, brother of Daphne
Michel Corboz (born 1934), Swiss conductor
Rachel Corboz, American soccer player